Filip Budzel (born 4 September 1996) is a Czech badminton player from Sokol Klimkovice badminton club.

Career 
In May 2017, he became the mixed doubles runner-up in three BWF Future Series tournaments partnered with Tereza Švábíková. At the Czech International they were beaten by their compatriots Jakub Bitman and Alžběta Bášová. In Romania, they were defeated by the German pair, and in Latvia defeated by the French pair.

Achievements

BWF International Challenge/Series 
Mixed doubles

  BWF International Challenge tournament
  BWF International Series tournament
  BWF Future Series tournament

References

External links 
 

1996 births
Living people
Czech male badminton players